Clyde Engineering was an Australian manufacturer of locomotives, rolling stock, and other industrial products.

It was founded in September 1898 by a syndicate of Sydney businessmen buying the Granville factory of timber merchants Hudson Brothers. The company won contracts for railway rolling stock, a sewerage system, trams and agricultural machinery. In 1907 it won its first contract for steam locomotives for the New South Wales Government Railways. By 1923 it had 2,200 employees. After contracting during the depression it became a major supplier of munitions during World War II.

In 1950 it was awarded the first of many contracts for diesel locomotives by the Commonwealth Railways after it was appointed the Australian licensee for Electro-Motive Diesel products. Apart from building locomotives and rolling stock, Clyde Engineering diversified into telephone and industrial electronic equipment, machine tools, domestic aluminium ware, road making and earth making equipment, hydraulic pumps, product finishing equipment, filtration systems, boilers, power stations and firing equipment, car batteries, hoists and cranes, door and curtain tracks and motor vehicle distribution.

In July 1996 it was taken over by Evans Deakin Industries. In March 2001 Evans Deakin was taken over by Downer Group to form Downer EDi.

Products
Amongst the classes of locomotives built by Clyde Engineering were:

Steam locomotives

Commonwealth Railways
 4 G class Granville
 10 L class Granville
 8 K class

New South Wales
10 C30T class rebuilt from C30 class Granville
45 C32 class Granville
65 C36 class Granville
5 C38 class Granville
30 D50 class Granville
160 D53 class Granville
120 D55 class Granville
25 D57 class Granville

South Australia
10 740 class Granville

Tasmania
20 Q class Granville
1 P class Granville

Diesel locomotives

Commonwealth Railways / Australian National
47 GM class Granville
17 CL class Granville
6 NJ class Granville
8 AL class Rosewater
10 BL class Rosewater
15 DL class Kelso
11 AN class Somerton

New South Wales
6 42 class Granville
10 421 class Granville
20 422 class Granville
18 49 class Granville
84 81 class Kelso
58 82 class Braemar

Victoria
26 B class Granville
18 S class Granville
94 T class Granville
75 Y class Granville
24 X class Granville / Rosewater
10 C class Rosewater
33 G class Rosewater / Somerton
11 A class (rebuilt from B class) Rosewater
13 P class (rebuilt from T class) Somerton
25 N class Somerton
5 H class (Modified T class) Granville

Queensland
13 1400 class Granville
10 1450 class Granville
42 1460 class Granville
29 1502 class Granville
27 1550 class Eagle Farm
12 1700 class Eagle Farm
56 1720 class Eagle Farm
27 2100 class Eagle Farm
11 2130 class Eagle Farm
8 2141 class Eagle Farm
14 2150 class Eagle Farm
45 2170 class Eagle Farm
24 2400 class Eagle Farm
18 2450 class Eagle Farm
38 2470 class Eagle Farm

Western Australia
25 A class Granville 
5 J class Granville
27 L class Granville / Eagle Farm
13 DB class Rosewater
19 Q class Forrestfield
11 S class Forrestfield

Mining
9 BHP Whyalla DE class Granville
5 Hamersley Iron EMD SD50 class Rosewater
1 Goldsworthy Mining Company GML10 Kelso

New Zealand
DA class NO's 1430–1439, Phase II variant of the class. Featured longer-than-standard chassis to accommodate a larger fuel tank than the earlier Phase I (1955) variant.
DBR class rebuilt from Canadian-built DB class in 1980–1982.
DC class rebuilt from Canadian-built Phase III DA class locomotives from 1978 to 1981.

Electric locomotives

Queensland
22 3300/3400 class Kelso / Somerton

Diesel railcars

South Australia
50 3000 class railcars Somerton

Electric multiple units

New South Wales
205 Suburban single deck carriages

Electric tramcars

New South Wales 

 10 C-Class Granville (delivered 1899–1900)
D-Class Granville (1890s)
70 E-Class Granville (delivered 1902–1903)
260 F-Class Granville (delivered 1899–1902)
195 R-Class Granville (delivered 1933–1935)
 55 R1-Class Granville (delivered 1935)

Other non-rail related products
 Lawnmowers and lead batteries - 1930s
 Servicing aircraft, naval vessels
 Mining equipment
 Automobile parts and accessories
 Bulldozers
 Bus bodies
 Cranes
 Structural steel (e.g. trusses for the Peats Ferry Bridge)
 Air cargo
 Lorries
 Filtration Systems (e.g. fume hoods, dust extractors, air filters)
 Roller Doors
 Materials Handling Equipment
 Automobile Assembly Paint Lines

Manufacturing Facilities
Granville closed 1973
Kelso opened early 1970s, closed before 2014
Somerton
Eagle Farm closed 1995
Rosewater opened 1974, closed April 1986
Forrestfield established in 1997 to assemble the Westrail Q and S classes, closed 1998

Non rail products
Woodville North - Clyde Apac Industries (Air filtration systems, Lemcol materials handling systems, Selson air jacks)
Revesby - B&D roller door systems 
Port Kembla - Clyde Carruthers
Because of capacity constraints, in the 1990s Clyde leased Australian National Industries' Braemar factory to fulfill its order for FreightCorp 82 class locomotives.

References

Further reading

A History of Clyde Engineering

External links

Companies formerly listed on the Australian Securities Exchange
Former General Motors subsidiaries
Defunct locomotive manufacturers of Australia
Australian companies established in 1898
Australian companies disestablished in 1996
Manufacturing companies based in Sydney